Zineddine Belaïd (born 20 March 1999) is an Algerian footballer who plays as a centre-back for USM Alger in the Algerian Ligue Professionnelle 1 and the Algeria A' national team.

Career
In 2020, Zineddine Belaïd signed a four-year contract with USM Alger.

References

External links
 

1999 births
Living people
People from Thénia
People from Thénia District
People from Boumerdès Province
Kabyle people
USM Alger players
Algerian footballers
Algeria youth international footballers
Association football central defenders
21st-century Algerian people
2022 African Nations Championship players
Algeria A' international footballers